Pariauccro or Pariaucro (possibly from Quechua parya reddish, copper or sparrow, ukru hole, pit, hollow) is a massif in the Huayhuash mountain range in the Andes of Peru. It is located in the Lima Region, Cajatambo Province, Cajatambo District. Pariauccro lies on a sub-range west of the main range, north of Mitopunta and northeast of Huacshash.

References

Mountains of Peru
Mountains of Lima Region